Andrea Petrucci (born 16 June 1991) is an Italian football player. He plays for Forlì F.C.

Club career
He made his Serie C debut for Fermana on 27 August 2017 in a game against Ravenna.

On 1 August 2019 he returned to Fermana for the third stint with the club.

On 3 August 2020 he signed a 2-year contract with Feralpisalò.

On 10 August 2021, he joined to Forlì F.C.

References

External links
 
 

1991 births
Living people
Sportspeople from the Province of Ascoli Piceno
Footballers from Marche
Italian footballers
Association football forwards
Serie C players
Serie D players
Eccellenza players
Promozione players
Ascoli Calcio 1898 F.C. players
Fermana F.C. players
S.S. Maceratese 1922 players
A.C. Carpi players
Vis Pesaro dal 1898 players
FeralpiSalò players
Forlì F.C. players